The Sayyd Alma Kalayy airstrike was a major friendly fire incident via airstrike during the Invasion of Afghanistan. It happened on December 5, 2001 when a U.S. soldier responsible for calling in airstrikes accidentally misguided the Boeing B-52 bomber to strike a hill held by American Special Forces and dozens of their Afghan allies.

Events 

Two days earlier, U.S. Army Special Forces then-Captain Jason Amerine (leading Operational Detachment Alpha 574) and Afghan tribal leader Hamid Karzai had been fighting in the towns of Tarinkot and Shawali Kowt before advancing towards the village of Sayyd Alma Kalay. The Taliban withdrew from the town, and Amerine and Karzai entered the town. After both talked in the headquarters, Amerine left to discuss further airstrikes with another officer. While studying a map, a huge explosion hit the hill near them, apparently from one of their own bombs. Amerine was wounded, while many on the hill were killed or also wounded. A military investigation revealed that the U.S. Air Force Combat Controller from the headquarters in Sayyd Alma Kalay who arrived earlier in the day made a mistake: due to a technical error with his issued GPS receiver, he did not realize that he had mistakenly given his own coordinates for an airstrike to the Boeing B-52 Stratofortress that ultimately dropped a 2,000 lb JDAM bomb on the hill, where several Americans and Afghans were located.

Casualties 

Three of Amerine's friends died:

Master Sergeant Jefferson Davis, 39 years old, of Watuga, Tennessee
Sergeant First Class Dan Petithory, 32 years old, of Cheshire, Massachusetts
Staff Sergeant Brian Prosser, 28 years old, of Bakersfield, California

10 Afghans died as well. Forty Afghans and Americans, including Amerine, were wounded. The wounded were taken to Ramstein Air Base in Germany for treatment.

References 

Friendly fire incidents
Airstrikes during the War in Afghanistan (2001–2021)
Battles of the War in Afghanistan (2001–2021) involving the United States
2001 in Afghanistan
December 2001 events in Asia
Attacks in Afghanistan in 2001
2001 airstrikes